Jonathan Pollak (born c. 1982) is an Israeli activist and graphic designer who works for Haaretz. He co-founded the direct action group Anarchists Against the Wall.

Early life
Jonathan Pollak was born around 1982 in Tel Aviv, Israel to actor Yossi Pollak and a psychologist named Tami. He is an Ashkenazi Jew. His father is an artist who refuses to perform in the West Bank, and his maternal grandfather, Nimrod Eshel, was imprisoned for leading a strike by seamen during the 1950s. As a teenager, Pollak was involved in the Israeli hardcore punk scene, which in the 1990s was strongly tied to anarchism, and became a straight edge. At the same time, Pollak became a vegan and an animal rights activist; years later he would state that "racism, chauvinism, sexism, speciesism all come from the same place of belittling the other".

Jonathan Pollak is the brother of actor Avshalom Pollak and film director Shai Pollak.

Activism
In 2003, Pollak co-founded the organization Anarchists Against the Wall, which protests the Israeli West Bank barrier. He participated in protests in Budrus in 2003 and 2004. In the mid-2000s, he joined protests against the barrier wall in Bil'in.

Pollak was struck in the head by a tear gas canister fired by an Israeli soldier in April 2005; he briefly lost consciousness and required stitches. He later accused Israeli forces of violating their regulations by deliberately firing the canister at him. An Israel Defense Forces (IDF) spokesperson stated that the canister had first struck a rock and then hit Pollak on a ricochet.

In October 2010, Pollak was fined $1,250 for participating in an illegal demonstration against the barrier; Palestinian activist Abdullah Abu Rahma was sentenced to a year in prison at the same hearing. On 27 December 2010, he was sentenced to three months in prison for illegal assembly for having participated in a January 2008 bicycle ride protest. A prison term for illegal assembly was an unusually severe sentence, attributed by one official to Pollak's three previous convictions on protest-related charges. He declined an offer by the court to have his sentence commuted to a community service requirement. Pollak was released from prison in February 2011 after having his sentence reduced for good behavior, and returned to demonstrating at the Palestinian village of Nabi Salih within the week.

After the death of Jawaher Abu Rahmah in January 2011, from a tear gas canister shot into his heart, Pollak criticized Israel's use of the gas against Palestinians, stating: "This death was caused by the fact that they are using tear gas that was banned in Europe in the 60s and 70s, because it is lethal. But here, on Palestinians, they continue using it". In May 2012, Pollak protested at the trial of Bassem al-Tamimi, a Nabi Saleh protest leader accused of organizing stone throwers and holding illegal demonstrations. In December, Pollak criticized the Israel Defense Forces for shooting in the face Mustafa Tamimi, a Nabi Saleh resident throwing stones at a military vehicle, who was struck with a tear gas canister; Tamimi later died from his injuries.

Pollak supports the international Boycott, Divestment and Sanctions (BDS) movement against Israel in protest at the occupation of the Palestinian territories. He has stated: "'Ni'lin, just like Soweto, needs the world to stand behind it and generate significant pressure. ... In Palestine, just as in South Africa, a strong BDS movement can make that change." He has defended Palestinian stone throwing against Israeli soldiers as a moral act of self-empowerment.

On 27 February 2018, a criminal complaint was filed against three activists in the organization Anarchists Against the Fence; Jonathan Pollak, Kobi Snitz, and Ilan Schleif. The complaint was filed by the organization Ad Kan in association with soldiers affected by demonstrations the three used to organize. Pollak, Snitz, and Shliff are charged with assaulting soldiers and police and organizing events in which security forces were wounded. On 6 January 2020, Pollak was arrested and imprisoned for not attending court hearings related to the case. Pollak said he does not accept the authority of Israeli courts to hear matters relating to “resisting israeli colonial rule”.

In early July 2019, Pollak was physically assaulted by two men who waited outside of his workplace and slashed him across the face with a knife. Pollak would not report the attack to the police. "My experience of the police is that they inflict more harm on us then what I just went through," he said. "The police is the last place in the world I'd go to for protection."

References 

1982 births
Living people
Israeli anarchists
Israeli activists
Israeli Ashkenazi Jews
Jewish anarchists